Francisco Fernández Moreno (born 21 April 1954) is a Spanish racing cyclist. He rode in the 1980 Tour de France.

References

External links
 

1954 births
Living people
Spanish male cyclists
Place of birth missing (living people)
People from Lebrija
Sportspeople from the Province of Seville
Cyclists from Andalusia